Veikko Peräsalo (1 February 1912 – 25 August 1992) was a Finnish athlete. He competed in the men's high jump at the 1936 Summer Olympics.

References

External links
 

1912 births
1992 deaths
Athletes (track and field) at the 1936 Summer Olympics
Finnish male high jumpers
Olympic athletes of Finland
People from Ilmajoki
Sportspeople from South Ostrobothnia